The Djiboutian passport is issued to citizens of Djibouti for international travel. The document is a biometric machine-readable passport with a blue cover with the text "République de Djibouti" above the coat of arms, and the text "passport" below it in Arabic and French. The passport is valid for 5 years and contains 31 pages. The passport includes the full name, photograph, signature and date of birth of the holder. The newer passports offer better security and state-of-the-art anti forging parameters and have a soft cover.

Issuing Requirements
Djiboutian passports are usually issued to Djiboutian citizens for a period of five years. To apply for a passport, either an Djiboutian National ID card is required, or a computerized birth certificate for those below the age of 18.

Identity Information Pages 
Djiboutian Passport Information appears on the hard cover, and includes the data as shown in the following order
 Photo of Passport Holder
 Type [of document, which is "P" for "passport"]
 Code [of the issuing country, which is "DJI" for "Republic of Djibouti"]
 Passport No.
 Full Name
 Date of Birth
 Place of Birth
 Nationality
 Sex
 Date of Issue
 Date of Expiry
 Issuing Office
 Machine Readable Zone
 No Signature Is Required

Visa free travel

Visa requirements for Djiboutian citizens are administrative entry restrictions by the authorities of other states placed on citizens of Djibouti. As of 2 July 2022, Djiboutian citizens had visa-free or visa on arrival access to 48 countries and territories, ranking the Djiboutian citizens 98th in terms of travel freedom according to the Henley Passport Index.

See also
Visa requirements for Djiboutian citizens
List of passports

References

Passports by country
Politics of Djibouti
Law of Djibouti